Emmanuelle Fabienne S. Camcam (born November 17, 1994), known professionally as Emmanuelle Vera, is a Filipino singer-songwriter, actress and beauty pageant titleholder.

She joined the Miss World Philippines 2021 competition and was crowned Reina Hispanoamericana Filipinas 2021. She represented the Philippines at the Reina Hispanoamericana 2021 competition and finished 3rd Runner-Up.

Career

Acting career
Vera portrayed the antagonist character Diana Rosales in the musical television show 1DOL on ABS-CBN. She was also one of the main cast of Shoutout!, a youth-oriented variety show formerly aired on the same network. She also appeared in numerous television shows such as Maalaala Mo Kaya and 100 Days to Heaven.

In April 2017, Vera left Star Magic and Cornerstone Entertainment after 7 years. She's currently a freelancer. In 2018, she made her debut appearance on GMA Network via The Stepdaughters.

Music career
In 2012, Vera released a self-titled debut album under Universal Records Philippines. The album has seven tracks, six of it are original, one is a cover. Vera also appeared as a celebrity video jockey in April on Myx, a Filipino music channel.

In 2013, Vera was invited to the Blind auditions of the first season of The Voice of the Philippines. She sang "Somewhere Over The Rainbow" by Judy Garland. She was successful in making apl.de.ap to turn his red chair for her, enabling her to advanced to the Battle round. She was eliminated during the Battle round.

On January 25, 2015, she starred in the music video for singer Thor Dulay's "Paano Ko Sasabihin".

In 2016, she joined the celebrity competition We Love OPM and became part of the trio O Diva together with Klarisse de Guzman and Liezel Garcia, mentored by KZ Tandingan. The group landed third place during the grand finals.

Pageantry

Miss World Philippines 2021

In May 2021, she was confirmed as an official candidate for the Miss World Philippines 2021 pageant that will take place on August 8. In October 2021, she was crowned as Reina Hispanoamericana Filipinas 2021 succeeding Maria Katrina Llegado.

Reina Hispanoamericana 2021

As Reina Hispanoamericana Filipinas 2021, Vera represented the Philippines at the Reina Hispanoamericana 2021 pageant on October 30, 2021 in Bolivia and finished as 3rd Runner-Up.

Miss Universe Philippines 2023

On February 18, 2023, she was announced as an official candidate for the Miss Universe Philippines 2023 pageant.

Discography
 By Popular Demand 2 (2011)
 Emmanuelle (2012)

Filmography

Film

Television

Personal life
In August 2018, she was engaged to Filipino-Spanish actor, Niko del Rosario.

References

External links
 

1996 births
Living people
Filipino people of American descent
Ateneo de Manila University alumni
Actresses from Manila
Filipino singer-songwriters
21st-century Filipino singers
Miss World Philippines winners
ABS-CBN personalities
Star Magic
Participants in Philippine reality television series
The Voice of the Philippines contestants
GMA Network personalities
Universal Records (Philippines) artists